Belgrade Nikola Tesla Airport or Belgrade Airport  is an international airport serving Belgrade, Serbia. It is operated by French conglomerate Vinci Airports and it is named after Serbian inventor Nikola Tesla (1856–1943).

The flag carrier and the largest airline of Serbia, Air Serbia, uses Belgrade Nikola Tesla as their hub. It is also one of the many operating bases for low-cost airline Wizz Air. The air taxi services Air Pink, Eagle Express and Prince Aviation also call the airport their home.

History

First airfields
The first airfield in Belgrade was inaugurated in 1910 in the neighbourhood of Banjica and was initially used by aviation pioneers such as Simon, Maslenikov, Vidmar and Čermak. Two years later a wooden hangar was built for the Serbian Air Force, which was at the time engaged in the First Balkan War against Turkey. In 1914, the Banjica airfield was the base for the Serbian Air Force squadron and the Balloon Company. After the end of the First World War, the Banjica airfield was used for airmail traffic and included the routes Novi Sad–Belgrade–Niš–Skoplje and Belgrade–Sarajevo–Mostar.

In 1911 another airfield was inaugurated in Belgrade, in the lower city of the Kalemegdan Fortress at the location of today's Belgrade Planetarium.

Airport in Pančevo
An airport on the outskirts of Pančevo, a town located northeast of Belgrade, began its operations in 1923 when CFRNA inaugurated the international route Paris–Istanbul which was flown via Belgrade. It was on that route that same year that the first world night flight ever happened in history. The same year airmail service began operating from the airport. The Pančevo airport was also used by the Royal Yugoslav Air Force academy. After the World War II the airport was used by the Yugoslav Air Force before it became the airfield of the Utva Aviation Industry after its relocation from Zemun to Pančevo.

Airport in Dojno Polje (New Belgrade)

Because of the distance from Pančevo to downtown Belgrade, which at that time required crossing the Danube, a decision was made to build a new airport which would be closer. The airport was planned to be built just across the river Sava, in a neighborhood today known as Novi Beograd. It was opened on 25 March 1927 under the official name of Belgrade International Airport (also known as Dojno polje Airport). From February 1928, the aircraft owned by the first local airline Aeroput started taking off from the new airport. The design for a reinforced concrete hangar that was built at the airfield was made by the Serbian scientist Milutin Milanković, better known for his theory of climate change. A modern terminal building was built in 1931, while the landing equipment for conditions of poor visibility was installed in 1936.

Before World War II, Belgrade was also used as a stopover for some major air races, such as The Schlesinger African Air Race.

Besides Aeroput, Air France, Deutsche Luft Hansa, KLM, Imperial Airways and airlines from Italy, Austria, Hungary, Romania and Poland also used the airport until the outbreak of the Second World War. Belgrade gained further prominence when Imperial Airways introduced inter-continental routes through Belgrade, when London was linked with India through the airport. Belgrade was linked with Paris and Breslau because CIDNA and Deutsche Luft Hansa, respectively, included Belgrade on its routes to Istanbul. By 1931, Belgrade became a major air hub being linked with regular flights with international destinations such as London, Madrid, Venice, Brussels, Berlin, Cologne, Warsaw, Prague, Vienna, Graz, Klagenfurt, Budapest, Bucharest, Sofia, Varna, Thessaloniki, Athens, Istanbul, and also intercontinental links with Cairo, Karachi and India.

Starting from April 1941, German occupation forces used the airport. During 1944 it was bombed by the Allies, and in October of the same year the German army destroyed the remaining facilities while withdrawing from the country.

The airport was rebuilt by October 1944 and until the end of the war was used by the Soviet Union and Yugoslavia as part of the Allied war effort.

Civil transport by Yugoslav Air Force cargo planes from this airport was reinstated at the end of 1945. At the beginning of 1947 JAT Yugoslav Airlines and JUSTA took over domestic and international traffic, and from 1948 Western European airlines resumed flights to Belgrade.

A constant increase in traffic and the beginning of the passenger jet era called for a significant expansion of the airport. In the meantime, a plan to build a residential and business district called Novi Beograd on the location of the airport was introduced. The officials decided therefore that a new international airport should be built near the village of Surčin to the west. The last flight to depart from the old airport was early in 1964.

Airport in Surčin
The new location for the airport was on the Surčin plateau,  from Belgrade's city centre. Thanks to the original planners' vision, two conditions for the airport's development were fulfilled: a location was chosen which met the navigational, meteorological, construction, technical, and traffic requirements; and the special needs for the airport's long-term development were established. 

Building of the new airport started in April 1958 and lasted until 28 April 1962, when it was officially opened by President Josip Broz Tito. During that period a  runway was built, with the parallel taxiway and concrete aprons for sixteen airplanes. Cargo storage spaces were also built, as well as a technical block with the air-traffic control tower and other accompanying facilities. Modern navigational equipment was installed, earning the airport the highest international classification according to the International Civil Aviation Organization.

The airport stagnated during the 1990s after the outbreak of the Yugoslav wars and the United Nations sanctions imposed on the Serbia and Montenegro. The sanctions also included a ban on air travel. The airport had minimal passenger movement, and many facilities were in need of reparation.

With a change in government and international sentiment, normal air traffic resumed in 2001. A few years later the airport's terminal 2 underwent a major reconstruction. The runway was upgraded to CAT IIIb in 2005, as part of a large renovation project. CAT IIIb is an Instrument Landing System (ILS), giving aircraft the security of landing during fog and storms. In 2006, the airport was renamed to Belgrade Nikola Tesla Airport. Nikola Tesla was a Serbian-American inventor and scientist, generally considered one of the world's most famous inventors. The construction of the new air traffic control centre was completed in 2010. In 2011 Belgrade Nikola Tesla Airport shares (AERO) began trading on the Belgrade Stock Exchange (BELEX).

2012–2018

In 2012, construction work on the modernization and expansion of the airport began. It was carried out on the expansion and reconstruction of the A-gate and C-gate departure and transit areas. As a result, an extra  was added. Jetways at the A and C gates were also replaced.

Also, there were plans for the construction of a new control tower as the current air control tower was built in 1962. Future expansion of current terminals should see additional 17,000 sqm added, with terminal 2 getting additional 4 jetways.

2018-present

In January 2018, the Government of Serbia granted a 25-year concession of the Belgrade Nikola Tesla Airport to the French airport operator Vinci Airports for a sum of 501 million euros. On 21 December 2018, Vinci formally took over the airport. In 2018, the airport had a sizeable increase in revenue and net income, due to Vinci Airports transaction.

Terminals
The airport's two terminals have a combined area of 33,000 sqm, with Terminal 2 being larger of the two, the two terminals are connected by a hallway. The airport has 66 check-in counters and 27 gates (of which 16 are equipped with jetways).

Terminal 1
Terminal 1 (T1) was the original and only terminal when the airport was built. The terminal handled domestic flights during the time of Yugoslavia and Serbia and Montenegro, and subsequently has come to be used for international flights, mostly by low-cost and charter airlines. The terminal went through a major renovation in 2016 and 2017 when the interior was overhauled.

Terminal 2
Terminal 2 (T2) was constructed in 1979 for the airport's growing passenger numbers. The terminal has a capacity of 5 million passengers. The terminal contains airline offices, transfer desks and various retail shops. The terminal went through two major renovations: from 2004 through 2006, with the arrivals and departures areas of the terminal completely reconstructed, and another one in 2012 and 2013 when there were works on expansion and overhaul of the C platform. While not officially confirmed, it is believed that the overhauled T1 will be used by foreign carriers, while Air Serbia and Etihad Airways Partners would gain exclusive use of Terminal 2.

Airlines and destinations

Passenger

The following airlines operate regular scheduled and charter flights as of December 2022:

Cargo
The following cargo airlines served the airport on a regular basis:

Statistics

Traffic figures

Passenger numbers

Busiest routes

Services

Security
Before the 2020/2021-2023 remodeling, Belgrade Nikola Tesla Airport was built with only one airside hallway for both departing and arriving passengers. As such, security checks used to be located at gate entrances rather than on a central location. As of 2021, however, there is a central security hall directly above the ticketing area, before passport control, where all passengers must be screened.

Passport controls are placed on two entrances and the single exit of the hallway. All passengers must pass the passport control, as there are no domestic flights. An additional security check used to exist on the hallway entrance, but it was removed in 2013 as it inconvenienced passengers and was not essential for security.

In 2007 the airport prohibited cars parking next to the airport terminal, instead they have to use the car park provided, as a result of the 2007 Glasgow International Airport attack.

Lounges

Belgrade Nikola Tesla Airport offers a single business class lounge, Business Club, for all airlines operating from the airport.

Airport also has a VIP lounge, with separate check-in and passport control facilities - also used by general aviation customers. The lounge consists of three parts - the first part for leisure, second for television crew and press conferences and a third part is a presidential suite. The lounge is also used as a press centre, upon the arrival of VIPs.

Air Serbia Premium Lounge is the first dedicated airline owned and operated lounge at the airport. It is open from 5 am 8pm every day for Air Serbia/ Etihad Airways business class passengers, as well as members of the Air Serbia/Etihad Guest frequent flyer program and other passengers who purchase one time lounge access.

Ground transport

Car
The airport is connected to the A3 motorway via a nearby interchange. The toll station on A3 is located to the west of the interchange, and the sections to the Belgrade downtown and the Belgrade bypass are toll-free. Licensed taxis from the airport to the city are available.

Bus
The following scheduled bus services connect the airport with its surroundings:

Rail
The airport does not yet have a rail connection to the city. But it is planned to build such a link.

See also
 Aeronautical Museum Belgrade
 List of airlines of Serbia
 List of airports in Serbia

References

External links

 Official website
 Belgrade Nikola Tesla International Airport at Airport-Data.com

1992 establishments in Serbia
Airfields of the United States Army Air Forces Air Transport Command in the European Theater
Airports in Serbia
Buildings and structures in Belgrade
Transport in Belgrade
Airports established in 1992